Shanghai is the cultural center of the Yangtze Delta Region in China. In late Ming Dynasty, Xu Guangqi started introducing European science to China.  Some notable modern scientists from Shanghai are listed below.

Notations for memberships of academies
United States of America:
Foreign Member/Member of the United States National Academy of Sciences = FM/M-NAS
Foreign Member/Member of the United States National Academy of Engineering = FM/M-NAE
Foreign Member/Member of the Institute of Medicine of the United States National Academies = FM/M-IM
 Member/Fellow of the American Academy of Arts and Sciences = M/F-AAAS
Member of the New York Academy of Sciences = M-NYAS
 United Kingdom:
 Fellow of the Royal Society = FRS
 Fellow of the Royal Academy of Engineering = FRAE
 Fellow of the British Academy = FBA
 Fellow of the Royal Society of Edinburgh = FRSE
 Germany:
 Foreign Member of the German Academy of Sciences Leopoldina = FM-GASL
 Foreign Member of the Bavarian Academy of Sciences and Humanities = FM-BASH
 France:
 Foreign Member of the French Academy of Sciences = FM-FAS
 Russia:
 Foreign Member of the Russian Academy of Sciences = FM-RAS
 Foreign Member of the Russian Academy of Engineering = FM-RAE
 Republic of China/Taiwan:
 Academician/Member of the Academia Sinica = M-AS
 People's Republic of China:
 Foreign Member/Member of the Chinese Academy of Sciences = FM/M-CAS
 Foreign Member/Member of the Chinese Academy of Engineering = FM/M-CAE
 Other:
 Member of the Third World Academy of Sciences = M-TWAS
 Member of the International Academy of Astronautics = M-IAA

Notations for personal profiles
 Priority: Hometown > birthplace > study/work (based on traditional Chinese convention)
 Hometown: h.
 Birthplace: b.
 Have trained/studied in Shanghai: s.
 Have worked in Shanghai: w.

Hometown Shanghai

For most Shanghainese scientists and engineers, their hometowns are in Jiangsu and Zhejiang Provinces.

 Xie Xuejing (h. Shanghai; b. Beijing): M-CAS/TWCS
 Terence Tao (ancestral hometown Shanghai, born Adelaide, Australia): Fields Medal laureate 2006

Birthplace Shanghai

United States

Mainland China

Taiwan, Hong Kong, Macau

See also 

 Shanghainese people
 Xu Guangqi
 List of universities and colleges in Shanghai
 List of modern scientists from Jiangsu
 List of modern scientists from Zhejiang

References

 
Scientists